Ahmed Sidi Taanoun, better known by his stage name DJ Hamida, is a French-Moroccan DJ musicien and record producer, known for release series of À La Bien Mix Party and Meknessi Style which he promotes. His biggest success has been with single "Déconnectés" featuring Kayna Samet, Rim'K & Lartiste, soprano

Discography

Albums

Singles

*Did not appear in the official Belgian Ultratop 50 charts, but rather in the bubbling under Ultratip charts.

Other charting releases

References

External links
 « Biographie DJ Hamida » on nrj.fr.
 Facebook

French DJs
Living people
French people of Moroccan descent
Year of birth missing (living people)
Place of birth missing (living people)